Rudy Santos (born 1953), also known by his stage name Octoman, is a man from the Philippines who has a rare condition known as parasitic twin. He is the oldest person ever recorded with this condition.

Remaining from his parasitic sibling are an extra leg and couple of arms, including shoulders and an extra pair of nipples, all of them attached to Santos's pelvis and protruding from his abdomen. Also, an undeveloped head is attached to his sternum, presenting an incipient ear and a patch of hair. Additionally, Santos's own right leg is severely deformed, ending on a stump at the height of the knee, preventing him from walking without the use of crutches.

History 
Belonging to an extremely poor family, during the 1970s and 1980s, Santos earned a living by appearing in freak shows, but during the late 1980s, he retired himself into seclusion, plunging into ten years of extreme poverty. In 2008, he was examined by a Filipino expert in separation of conjoined twins, and a removal surgery was deemed viable, but Santos ultimately rejected it, claiming that he had grown too attached to his appendages during his life to have them removed at that point.

References 

1953 births
Living people
Sideshow performers
Filipino people with disabilities
People with parasitic twins
Filipino twins